The Black Hair EP is the first release from Arkitekt, Noel Hogan's second side project from The Cranberries. It was released in 2007 in the Republic of Ireland. Arkitekt also released, as a download from Gohan Records' website, the demo versions of the tracks comprising The Black Hair EP plus a fourth demo track. "Track 34 (working demo)" is a very early demo of "Pacing" which can be found on the 14 Days single.

Track list
Black Hair (3:54)
Nights End (4:30)
Breathe (4:41)

Demo track list
Nights End (demo) (4:31)
Black Hair (demo) (3:21)
Breathe (demo) (4:28)
Track 34 (working demo) (5:38)

Band members
Noel Hogan – guitar, programming, backing vocals
Richard Walters – lead vocals

References

External links
Gohan Records website – notice of demo EP availability

2007 debut EPs
Arkitekt EPs
2007 debut albums
Demo albums